Ashraf Hydroz is an Indian Sufi and Hindustani classical musician, primarily focusing on Qawwali, mystic ghazals and Sufiana Kalaams, a devotional musical form of the Sufi Muslims. He is a disciple of renowned Hindustani musician Ustad Fayaz Khan from Bangalore.

Biography 
Ashraf Hydroz was born in Mattancherry, Cochin, India, and his instinct of music is carried over from his father late Mr Hydroz, who was a very versatile artist. Inspired by the Sabri Brothers, he went on to pursue a Masters and M.Phil in music from Delhi University, from the Faculty of Music and Fine Arts, where he obtained the "Sangeeta Siromani" title.

Career 
He has performed at various prestigious occasions including the "Kochi-Muziris Biennale" (2016-2017), and portrayed his Sufi musical enchantments across stages in India, USA and Australia. He also formed and leads his Sufi music band "Khayal-e-Qawwali".

References

External links 
 

Year of birth missing (living people) 
Sufi artists
Indian qawwali singers
Singers from Kerala
Urdu-language singers
Living people